Compañia de Minas Buenaventura is a Peruvian precious metals company engaged in the mining and exploration of gold, silver and other metals.

References 

Companies listed on the New York Stock Exchange
Silver mining companies
Gold mining companies